Evpatiy Kolovrat is a Russian icebreaker built at the Almaz Shipbuilding Company for the Russian Navy. The vessel is scheduled to enter service with the Pacific Fleet in 2023.

Development and construction 

In the mid-2010s, the Ministry of Defence of the Russian Federation announced that a fleet of new auxiliary icebreakers would be built for the Russian Navy as part of the ongoing fleet renewal program to replace Soviet-era vessels. However, the initial plans for the construction of four  Project 21180 icebreakers was revised after the lead ship, Ilya Muromets, turned out to be too expensive. As a response to this, Vympel Design Bureau developed a revised design, 21180M, with about two thirds of the displacement and more limited functionality compared to the bigger vessel.

The construction of the Project 21180M icebreaker, estimated to cost between 5 and 6 billion rubles, was awarded to the Saint Petersburg-based Almaz Shipbuilding Company in 2017 and the keel of the vessel was laid on 12 December 2018. The hull of Evpatiy Kolovrat, named after the 13th century bogatyr described in The Tale of the Destruction of Ryazan, was launched on 24 November 2020. In August 2022, the unfinished vessel was towed to the Baltic Shipyard for the installation of its mast prior to sea trials in the Gulf of Finland in December. Evpatiy Kolovrat was scheduled to join the Russian Navy before the end of the year, but remained in Saint Petersburg until January 2023 when the vessel departed for her home port in Petropavlovsk-Kamchatsky.

There are plans to build a second Project 21180M icebreaker for the Northern Fleet following on Evpatiy Kolovrat. Service entry is envisaged for 2027.

Design 

The icebreaker will be served by a crew of 28.

Evpatiy Kolovrat will feature a diesel-electric power plant with three  diesel generators that provide electricity for both propulsion motors and auxiliary systems. The icebreaker will be propelled by three stainless steel monoblock propellers, two driven by Steerprop azimuth thrusters and the third by a fixed shaft line. In addition, the vessel will have a  bow thruster.

The vessel's speed in open water will be  and range .

References 

Icebreakers of Russia